Saambou Bank was a South African bank that was founded in 1942 and was liquidated in 2006.

History 
The bank was founded on June 12, 1942 under the name Unie Bouvereniging. Shortly afterwards, the company took the name Saambou (Permanente) Bouvereniging. In 1970 it merged with Nasionale Bouvereniging, creating Saambou Nasionale Bouvereniging. They went public as Saambou Beherend in 1987 and traded under the name Saambou Bank.

Bankruptcy 
The bank went into bankruptcy in February 2002 after newspaper articles speculated about it being bankrupt and customers withdrew R1 billion in two days. At the time it went into receivership, Saambou was the sixth-largest bank in the country. The JSE Limited stopped trading in its shares that same year, and First National Bank (South Africa) took over some of its mortgage business.

Liquidation 
The bank was finally liquidated in 2006. A dividend of R7.568 billion, or 4.53c per share, was paid out to shareholders. The share had traded at 203c per share before the bankruptcy.

Further reading 
 Mbuya, John Chibaya. The Rise and Fall of Saambou Bank. 2005. Mbuya Books. .

References 

Defunct banks of South Africa